Cyana thoracica is a moth of the family Erebidae. It was described by Walter Rothschild and Karl Jordan in 1912. It is found in New Guinea.

References

Cyana
Moths described in 1912